Marc Benz (born 15 November 1982 in Altstätten) is a Swiss racing driver. He has competed in such series as Porsche Supercup, Formula Renault 2000 Eurocup and Formula Renault V6 Eurocup.

References

External links
 Official website
 

1982 births
Living people
Swiss racing drivers
Formula Ford drivers
German Formula Renault 2.0 drivers
Formula Renault Eurocup drivers
German Formula Three Championship drivers
Formula Renault V6 Eurocup drivers
People from Altstätten
Porsche Supercup drivers
Sportspeople from the canton of St. Gallen

Jenzer Motorsport drivers
Porsche Carrera Cup Germany drivers